Michael Calvin Richardson (born May 23, 1961) is a former American college and professional football player who was a cornerback in the National Football League (NFL) for seven seasons during the 1980s.

College career
He played college football for Arizona State University, and was recognized as an All-American in 1981 and 1982. Richardson was only the 6th All-American in ASU history at the time, and the second player ever to achieve it twice. In his final two seasons, the Sun Devils went 19-4, and he closed out his college career with a win over University of Oklahoma in the 1982 Fiesta Bowl.  In his four years at Arizona State, he intercepted 18 passes, returning them for 131 yards and two touchdowns.

Professional career
He played professionally for the NFL's Chicago Bears and San Francisco 49ers, and won a Super Bowl as a member of the 1985 Chicago Bears.

Richardson finished his 7-season career with 20 interceptions, which he returned for 247 yards and a touchdown. He also recorded 4 fumble recoveries. Known as "L.A. Mike", he was a featured soloist of the "Shuffling Crew" in the Super Bowl Shuffle video in 1985.  His line in the song "I like to steal it and make em pay" would be reflected in his performance on the field, as he finished the season with a remarkable 174 return yards from just 4 interceptions.

Personal life
In 2008 Richardson faced a 13-year sentence for possession of methamphetamine and crack cocaine. It was his 21st drug conviction since the end of his football career. Former teammate Richard Dent and coach Mike Ditka both supported Richardson being sent to a rehab facility rather than prison. The judge ultimately sentenced Richardson to a year in prison and an extended probation period, violation of which would result in Richardson serving the remainder of a 13-year sentence.

In late December 2020, Richardson was arrested for homicide in Phoenix, in relation to a suspected cocaine transaction gone awry.  On September  21, 2022 Richardson plead guilty to manslaughter and faces up to 30 years in prison.  Sentencing is scheduled for October 25, 2022 according to Maricopa County Court records.

References 

1961 births
Living people
All-American college football players
American football cornerbacks
Arizona State Sun Devils football players
Chicago Bears players
Prisoners and detainees of Arizona
Players of American football from Compton, California
San Francisco 49ers players